Brûlé Lake is a lake in western Alberta, Canada. It is formed along the Athabasca River, immediately east of Jasper National Park and 30 km west of Hinton. According to one tradition, the lake was named for a burnt tract of woods near the site.

The Brûlé Lake sand dunes are a popular place for all-terrain vehicle driving.

The main line of the Canadian National Railway—which is also used by Via Rail's Canadian passenger train—passes on the western side of the lake, while the Yellowhead Highway passes on the eastern side.

The lake lies at an elevation of 984 m, is 10 km long, and has a maximum width of 2 km. The total water area is 14.5 km2.

Between 1799 and 1801, Hudson's Bay Company had a trading post established on the shores of the lake.

References

See also
Lakes of Alberta

Lakes of Alberta
Yellowhead County